Fernando Mario Burgos Gallardo (born 17 January 1980) is a Chilean former footballer who played as a goalkeeper.

Honours

Club
Real Potosí
Torneo Apertura: 2007

References

External links
 
 

1980 births
Living people
Footballers from Santiago
Chilean footballers
Chilean expatriate footballers
Club Deportivo Universidad Católica footballers
Provincial Osorno footballers
Deportes Magallanes footballers
Club Real Potosí players
Club Deportivo Palestino footballers
Cobresal footballers
Deportes Copiapó footballers
Curicó Unido footballers
Deportes Colchagua footballers
Magallanes footballers
Chilean Primera División players
Primera B de Chile players
Segunda División Profesional de Chile players
Chilean expatriate sportspeople in Bolivia
Expatriate footballers in Bolivia
Association football goalkeepers